Enio Edward Conti (February 15, 1913 – May 22, 2005) was a professional American football guard in the National Football League for five seasons for the Philadelphia Eagles. He was also a member of the "Steagles", a team that was the result of a temporary merger between the Eagles and Pittsburgh Steelers due to the league-wide manning shortages in 1943 brought on by World War II.

External links

1913 births
2005 deaths
Sportspeople from Naples
Italian players of American football
American football offensive guards
Philadelphia Eagles players
Steagles players and personnel
Bucknell Bison football players
Italian emigrants to the United States